Averøya is an island in the municipality of Averøy in Møre og Romsdal county, Norway.  It is located north of the Romsdal peninsula surrounded by the Kornstadfjord on the west and the Kvernesfjord on the south and east.  The main villages on the  island include Bruhagen, Kvernes, Kornstad, Kårvåg, Langøy, and Bremsnes.

The island is connected to the mainland by the Atlanterhavsveien road, and it is connected to Kristiansund via the Atlantic Ocean Tunnel.

In popular culture
Norwegian comedy duo Ylvis made a music video about the island's need for an information sign. The video was recorded with a number of other Norwegian celebrities, (satirically) saying they are trying to raise money for a sign.

References

Averøy
Islands of Møre og Romsdal